Richard D. (Dick) Keyes (October 19, 1930 – August 27, 2012) was an American painter associated with abstract expressionism, impressionist landscapes and the California Plein-Air Painting revival.  Keyes was a Professor Emeritus at Long Beach City College, where he taught life drawing and painting for 30 years, between 1961 and 1991.  He continued to teach, lecture and demonstrate throughout his retirement, with groups such as the Huntington Beach Art League.

Biography

Richard Keyes was born in Detroit, Michigan, in 1930.  His parents, Richard and Estella, 
encouraged his interest in art early on, and enrolled him in an art school at the age of 
16. This propelled him to attend Highland Park Community College and Wayne State University in Detroit.
Keyes then served in the United States Air Force, during the Korean War. Upon his discharge from the Air Force and after returning to the United States, he attended the University of Michigan, earning his BA in Design in 1957.  After marrying, he and his wife Carol moved to California, where he enrolled in the higher education program in Art at the University of California, Berkeley. While at Berkeley, he studied under artists David Park, Glenn Wessels and Erle Loran, and in 1958, he received his Masters in Painting.  His style of painting at this time was Abstract Expressionist, and the Berkeley experience was very important to him, as he said it solidified his awareness and control of the abstract in visual art.

Within several years, Keyes' work shifted to abstracted landscapes.  After a period of making 
welded steel sculptures, he returned to painting, though in a more realistic, yet impressionistic 
style.  His most frequent subjects were the great rolling landscapes and seascapes typical 
of California's Central and South Coasts, but he also painted in much of the Sierra Nevada Mountains of eastern California.

After his retirement, Keyes studied with California Art Club members Ken Auster, Roger Armstrong, Jeff Horn and Mario Mirkovich.  He continued to be a member of several artists groups, such as the California Plein-Air Painters Association  and Laguna Beach Plein-Air Painters Association.  He exhibited his work every summer at the Art-A-Fair Festival, in Laguna Beach, California, only stopping these shows due to his declining health.  He died at home of complications from heart failure at the age of 81.

Exhibitions

San Francisco Museum of Art, 77th Annual SF Art Association Show - 1958 
Oakland Art Museum, California Painters' Annual Exhibitions - 1958, 1960 
Jack London Square Annual - 1958, 1959, 1960
Tulare County Art League Annual - 1959 1st & 2nd Prize
Downey Museum 7th Annual - 1964 Honorable Mention
CSU Long Beach / Long Beach City College Faculty Int'l - 1965
All California Art Show, San Diego - 1965
1st Annual So. California Teachers Show, Los Angeles - 1966
1ntroductions '69, 4 person show, Downey Art Museum - 1969 
Prospectives / Art '70, Huntington Beach - 1970 
Long Beach City College Faculty Exhibitions - 1963 to 1991
Silver Discovery Award - Art of California Magazine 1991
Bronze Discovery Award - Art of California Magazine 1991
Los Alamitos Art League Annual - 1991
Long Beach City College: 30 Year Retrospective Show - 1991
Crystal Court Art Walk Exhibit, South Coast Plaza - 1992
Huntington Beach Art League Art Associates Open Show - 1992 to 2011 (1995 Best of Show)
Affair in the Garden, Beverly Hills - 1992
Yosemite National Park, Guest Artist/Instructor - 1993 to 2007
Newport Beach Public Library, Solo Show - 1993 
Descanso Gardens, La Canada - 1994
Wilshire Landmark & Northrop Plaza Show - 1995
Morro Bay Harbor Festival - 1995
All Southern California Open - 1997
Artists Corner Gallery, Solo Show - 1997
Newport Beach Spring Juried Show - 1997
Orange County Fair - 1997 Honorable Mention
Surf City Festival Art Show - 1998 2nd Prize, 1999 1st Prize
Cypress Juried Show - 1999
Bolsa Chica Open - 2000
Morro Bay Art in the Park - 2002
Laguna Plein Air Painters Assoc. Juried Show - 2001-2006, 2012
So. Cal. Plein Air Painters Assoc. Juried Show - 2002-2004
Anaheim Art Assoc. Show - 2006
Art-A-Fair, Laguna Beach - 1991 to 2011
Banter, Worldwide - 2014

References

External links
 Richard Keyes (Official Site)
 Laguna art festivals kick into high gear, Orange County Register, July 5, 2010

1930 births
University of Michigan alumni
Abstract expressionist artists
20th-century American painters
American male painters
21st-century American painters
21st-century American male artists
University of California, Berkeley alumni
Painters from California
2012 deaths
20th-century American male artists